

The Lioré et Olivier LeO 40 was a French experimental biplane built by Lioré et Olivier. The two-seat LeO 40 had full span slats fitted to both wings, it was powered by a  Argus engine in Pusher configuration. Only one was built and the design was abandoned.

Specifications

References

Notes

Bibliography 

1930s French experimental aircraft
40
Biplanes
Single-engined pusher aircraft